The Nova Scotia Highlanders (also known as North Novies, North Novas) is an infantry regiment in the primary reserve of the Canadian Army. It is part of 36 Canadian Brigade Group, 5th Canadian Division.

Creation 

The regiment was formed in 1954 by the amalgamation of The North Nova Scotia Highlanders, The Cape Breton Highlanders, and The Pictou Highlanders and 189th Light Anti Aircraft Battery, Royal Canadian Artillery.

The regiment was composed of two separate units, officially designated as the 1st Battalion, The Nova Scotia Highlanders (North), and 2nd Battalion, The Nova Scotia Highlanders (Cape Breton), both of which were part of 5th Canadian Division's 36 Canadian Brigade Group.

The 1st Battalion is headquartered in Truro with individual companies located in Amherst, Pictou, New Glasgow, Springhill, and Truro.

The 2nd Battalion was headquartered in Sydney, and in 2011 it was renamed back to its pre-1954 designation, the Cape Breton Highlanders. This leaves The Nova Scotia Highlanders as a one-battalion regiment.

Headdress 
Although the 2nd Battalion continued the proud tradition of wearing balmorals, the traditional headdress of the regiment, the 1st Battalion did not. There was a strong movement within the unit by the majority of the troops to replace the beret with the balmoral once again as it marked out the highland unit as distinctive and showed the ties with the unit's heritage that contributed to its ésprit de corps. As of January 1, 2011, the balmoral once again became the official headdress of the 1st Battalion as well. The khaki tam o' shanter is worn in combat dress.

Lineage

1st Battalion, Nova Scotia highlanders (North)

Originated in Truro, Nova Scotia, 6 April 1871 as the Colchester and Hants Provisional Battalion of Infantry
Redesignated as the 78th Colchester and Hants, or Highlanders Battalion of Infantry, 1 September 1871
Redesignated as the 78th "Colchester, Hants and Pictou" Battalion of Infantry or "Highlanders," 5 September 1879
Redesignated as the 78th Colchester, Hants and Pictou Regiment "Highlanders," 8 May 1900
Redesignated as the 78th Pictou Regiment "Highlanders," 1 March 1910
Redesignated as The Pictou Regiment, 29 March 1920
Redesignated as The Pictou Highlanders, 2 July 1920
Redesignated as the 2nd (Reserve) Battalion, The Pictou Highlanders, 7 November 1940
Redesignated as The Pictou Highlanders (Motor), 1 April 1946
Amalgamated on 12 November 1954 with The North Nova Scotia Highlanders and the 189th Light Anti-Aircraft Battery, RCA and redesignated the 1st Battalion of The Nova Scotia Highlanders
On 9 December 2010 the 2nd Battalion, The Nova Scotia Highlanders (Cape Breton) was reorganized as a separate regiment and redesignated as The Cape Breton Highlanders, the 1st battalion was redesignated the 1st Battalion, Nova Scotia highlanders (North)

The North Nova Scotia Highlanders

Originated in Amherst, Nova Scotia, 6 April 1871 as the Cumberland Provisional Battalion of Infantry
Redesignated as the 93rd Cumberland Battalion of Infantry, 12 June 1885
Redesignated as the 93rd Cumberland Regiment, on 8 May 1900
Redesignated as The Cumberland Regiment, 29 March 1920
Redesignated as The Cumberland Highlanders, 15 June 1927
Amalgamated on 1 December 1936 with The Colchester and Hants Regiment (less 'C Company') and C Company of the 6th Machine Gun Battalion, CMGC (now The Princess Louise Fusiliers) and redesignated as The North Nova Scotia Highlanders (Machine Gun)
Redesignated as the 2nd (Reserve) Battalion, The North Nova Scotia Highlanders (Machine Gun), 7 November 1940
Redesignated as the 2nd (Reserve) Battalion, The North Nova Scotia Highlanders, 7 March 1941
Redesignated as The North Nova Scotia Highlanders, 1 May 1946. 
Amalgamated on 12 November 1954 with The Pictou Highlanders (Motor) and the 189th Light Anti-Aircraft Battery, RCA

The Colchester and Hants Regiment

Originated in Truro, Nova Scotia, 1 April 1910 as the 70th Colchester and Hants Regiment
Redesignated as the 76th Colchester and Hants Rifles, 2 May 1910
Amalgamated on 15 May 1920 with the 81st "Hants" Regiment and redesignated as 'The Colchester and Hants Regiment
Amalgamated on 1 December 1936, less "C" Company, with The Cumberland Highlanders and C Company of the 6th Machine Gun Battalion, CMGC

The 81st "Hants" Regiment
Originated in Windsor, Nova Scotia, 16 February 1914 as an "8 company Regiment of Infantry in Hants County"
Redesignated as the 68th Regiment, 1 May 1914
Redesignated as the 81st "Hants" Regiment, 1 June 1914
Amalgamated on 15 May 1920 with the 76th Colchester and Hants Rifles

189th Light Anti-Aircraft Battery, RCA
Originated in Stellarton, Nova Scotia, 1 April 1946
Amalgamated on 12 November 1954 with The Pictou Highlanders (Motor) and The North Nova Scotia Highlanders

Chart

Perpetuations

War of 1812
1st Battalion, County of Sydney Regiment
2nd Battalion, County of Sydney Regiment
1st Battalion, Cumberland Regiment
Parrsborough Corps

The Great War
17th Battalion (Nova Scotia Highlanders), CEF
25th Battalion (Nova Scotia Rifles), CEF
106th Battalion (Nova Scotia Rifles), CEF
193rd Battalion (Nova Scotia Highlanders), CEF
246th Battalion (Nova Scotia Highlanders), CEF

Operational history

South African War
The 193rd Cumberland Battalion of Infantry contributed volunteers for the Canadian Contingents during the South African War.

World War One
Details of the 76th Colchester and Hants Rifles, the 78th Pictou Regiment "Highlanders" and the 93rd Cumberland Regiment were placed on active service on 6 August 1914 for local protection duties.

The 17th Battalion (Nova Scotia Highlanders), CEF was authorized on 19 September 1914 and embarked for Great Britain on 29 September 1914 where it was redesignated  as the 17th Reserve Battalion, CEF on 29 April 1915, to provide reinforcements for the Canadian Corps. The battalion was disbanded on 21 May 1917.

The 25th Battalion (Nova Scotia Rifles), CEF was authorized on 7 November 1914 and embarked for Great Britain on 20 May 1915. It disembarked in France on 16 September 1916, where it fought as part of the 5th Infantry Brigade, 2nd Canadian Division in France and Flanders until the end of the war. The battalion was disbanded on 15 September 1920.

The 106th Battalion (Nova Scotia Rifles), CEF was authorized on 22 December 1915 and embarked for Great Britain on 15 July 1916 where it provided reinforcements for the Canadian Corps until 5 October 1916, when its personnel were absorbed by the 40th Battalion, CEF. The battalion was disbanded on 8 December 1917.

The 193rd Battalion (Nova Scotia Highlanders), CEF was authorized on 15 July 1916 and embarked for Great Britain on 12 October 1916 where it provided reinforcements for the Canadian Corps in the field until 20 January 1917, when its personnel were absorbed by the 17th Reserve Battalion, CEF. The battalion was disbanded on 18 February 1918.

The 246th Battalion (Nova Scotia Highlanders), CEF was authorized on 1 May 1917 and embarked for Great Britain on 2 June 1917. On 9 June 1917, its personnel were absorbed by the 17th Reserve Battalion, CEF to provide reinforcements for the Canadian Corps in the field. The battalion was disbanded on 11 April 1918.

The Second World War
Details of The Pictou Highlanders were called out on service on 26 August 1939 and then placed on active service on 1 September 1939 as The Pictou Highlanders, Canadian Active Service Force (Details), for local protection duties. The details called out on active service disbanded on 31 December 1940.

The regiment mobilized the 1st Battalion, The Pictou Highlanders, CASF for active service on 1 January 1941. It served in Newfoundland from March to August 1943 in a home defence role as part of Atlantic Command. In September 1943, one company was despatched to the Bahamas, where it performed garrison duty until 28 March 1946. The battalion was disbanded on 30 April 1946.

On 10 September 1942, a sub-component of the regiment, designated Special Infantry Company (Pictou Highlanders), CASF, was mobilized for active service. It served in Bermuda on garrison duty from 12 November 1942 to 1 April 1946. The company disbanded on 30 April 1946.

Details of The North Nova Scotia Highlanders were called out on service on 26 August 1939 and then placed on active service on 1 September 1939 as The North Nova Scotia Highlanders (Machine Gun), CASF (Details), for local protection duties. The details called out on active service were disbanded on 31 December 1940.

The regiment subsequently mobilized The North Nova Scotia Highlanders, CASF for active service on 24 May 1940. It was redesignated as the 1st Battalion, The North Nova Scotia Highlanders, CASF on 7 November 1940. It embarked for Great Britain on 18 July 1941. On D-Day, 6 June 1944, it landed in Normandy as part of the 9th Infantry Brigade, 3rd Canadian Infantry Division, and it continued to fight in North-West Europe until the end of the war. The overseas battalion disbanded on 15 January 1946.

On 1 June 1945, the regiment mobilized the 3rd Battalion, The North Nova Scotia Highlanders, Canadian Infantry Corps, Canadian Army Occupation Force for service with the Canadian Army Occupation Force in Germany. The battalion disbanded on 1 May 1946.

Post-War

On 4 May 1951, the regiment mobilized two temporary Active Force companies designated "E" and "F".

"E" Company was reduced to nil strength upon its personnel being incorporated into the 1st Canadian Highland Battalion for service in Germany with the North Atlantic Treaty Organization and was disbanded on 29 July 1953. On 16 October 1953 the 1st Canadian Highland Battalion was redesignated the 1st Battalion, The Black Watch (Royal Highland Regiment) of Canada.

"F" Company was initially used as a reinforcement pool for "E" Company. On 15 May 1952, it was reduced to nil strength, upon its personnel being absorbed by the newly formed 2nd Canadian Highland Battalion for service in Korea with the United Nations. "F" Company was disbanded on 29 July 1953. On 16 October 1953 the 2nd Canadian Highland Battalion was redesignated the 2nd Battalion, The Black Watch (Royal Highland Regiment) of Canada.

War In Afghanistan
The regiment contributed an aggregate of more than 20% of its authorized strength to the various Task Forces which served in Afghanistan between 2002 and 2014.

Battle honours
The Nova Scotia Highlanders have received 47 battle honours and 1 honorary distinction since the unit's inception. In the list below, battle honours in small capitals were awarded for participation in large operations and campaigns, while those in lowercase indicate honours granted for more specific battles.

Photo Gallery

Armouries

See also

 Canadian-Scottish regiment
 West Nova Scotia Regiment
 List of armouries in Canada
 Military history of Nova Scotia
 Military history of Canada
 History of the Canadian Army
 Canadian Forces

Media
 No Retreating Footsteps: The Story of the North Novas by Will R. Bird (1955)
 The Fighting North Novies: Into the Fire by Al Cameron
 Eighty-Fifth in France and Flanders Being a history of the justly famous 85th Canadian Infantry Battalion (Nova Scotia Highlanders) Jan 1 1920 by Lt-Col Joseph Hayes (Author) 
 North Nova Scotia Highlanders by D.F. Forbes (1945)

Notes

References 

 Barnes, RM, The Uniforms and History of the Scottish Regiments, London, Sphere Books Limited, 1972.

External links

Nova Scotia Highlanders Regimental Museum

Order of precedence 

Nova Scotia Highlanders
Infantry regiments of Canada
Highland & Scottish regiments of Canada
Highland regiments
Nova Scotia Military Units
Military regiments raised in Nova Scotia
Military units and formations of Nova Scotia
Military units and formations established in 1954
Truro, Nova Scotia